Mosi is a masculine given name. Notable people with the name include:

Mosi Alli (born 1961), Tanzanian sprinter
Mosi Tatupu (1955–2010), National Football League special teamer and running back from American Samoa

See also
Mossi (given name)

Masculine given names